Slimane Illoul (born December 12, 1983 in Kouba, Algiers) is an Algerian football player. He currently plays for USM Blida in the Algerian Ligue Professionnelle 1.

External links
 
 

1983 births
Living people
Footballers from Algiers
Algerian footballers
Algerian Ligue Professionnelle 1 players
CA Batna players
CA Bordj Bou Arréridj players
MC Alger players
RC Kouba players
USM Blida players
Algerian Ligue 2 players
Association football midfielders
21st-century Algerian people